Anthopterus wardii, the aengue mishito, is a species of Anthopterus belonging to the family Ericaceae. It is native to the tropical regions of Central and South America, such as Panama, Colombia, and Ecuador.

Description
Anthopterus wardii is a flowering shrub with flowers ranging from pink to orange in color and 8–10 mm long. Its leaves are elliptic to ovate-elliptic and 4–10 x 1.5–3.5 cm in size. Its racemose usually have 2–10 flowers.

Health benefits
Anthopterus wardii has possible health benefits based on its antioxidant properties and phenolic profile. This can be the precursor for many compounds with health benefits including, antibacterial, anti-inflammatory, and antimutagenic activities. It is possible that the antioxidants can help prevent heart disease.

References

Ericaceae
Plants described in 1884
Flora of Panama
Flora of Ecuador
Flora of Colombia